James Marfell Scudamore CB was the Chief Veterinary Officer (CVO) of the United Kingdom and for Department for Environment, Food and Rural Affairs (DEFRA) from April 1997 until he retired March 2004, and prior to this he was Assistant Chief Veterinary Officer, Scotland from 1990 to 1996. He was made a Companion of the Order of the Bath in the 2004 New Year Honours. He was succeeded as CVO by Debby Reynolds.

After he retired from CVO work he became professor of livestock and public health in the department of veterinary medicine at the University of Liverpool.

References

British veterinarians
Living people
Year of birth missing (living people)
Companions of the Order of the Bath
People educated at Chester City Grammar School